Yarra Prithvi Raj (born 20 February 1998) is an Indian cricketer. He made his first-class debut for Andhra in the 2017–18 Ranji Trophy on 6 October 2017. In July 2018, he was named in the squad for India Red for the 2018–19 Duleep Trophy. He made his List A debut for Andhra in the 2018–19 Vijay Hazare Trophy on 15 October 2018.

In December 2018, he was bought by the Kolkata Knight Riders in the player auction for the 2019 Indian Premier League. He made his Twenty20 debut for Andhra in the 2018–19 Syed Mushtaq Ali Trophy on 28 February 2019. In October 2019, he was named in India B's squad for the 2019–20 Deodhar Trophy. He was released by the Kolkata Knight Riders ahead of the 2020 IPL auction.

References

External links
 

1998 births
Living people
Indian cricketers
Place of birth missing (living people)
Andhra cricketers
India Red cricketers
Kolkata Knight Riders cricketers